Highland Springs, California may refer to:
Highland Springs, Lake County, California
Highland Springs, Riverside County, California